The Great Malvern tornado of 1761 occurred on Wednesday, 14 October 1761 in the vicinity of Great Malvern, Worcestershire, in England.  It was described as follows:

References

Tornadoes in the United Kingdom
1761 in England
Malvern, Worcestershire
Tornadoes of 1761
History of Worcestershire
Weather events in England
18th century in Worcestershire